Diablo wind is a name that has been occasionally used for the hot, dry wind from the northeast that typically occurs in the San Francisco Bay Area of Northern California, during the spring and fall.  

The same wind pattern also affects other parts of California's coastal ranges and the western slopes of Sierra Nevada, with many media and government groups using the term Diablo winds for strong, dry downslope wind over northern and central California.

Name
The term first appeared shortly after the 1991 Oakland firestorm, perhaps to distinguish it from the comparable, and more familiar, hot dry wind in Southern California known as the Santa Ana winds. In fact, in decades previous to the 1991 fire, the term "Santa Ana" was occasionally used as well for the Bay Area dry northeasterly wind, such as the one that was associated with the 1923 Berkeley Fire.

The name "Diablo wind" refers to the fact that the wind blows into the inner Bay Area from the direction of Mount Diablo in adjacent Contra Costa County.  The name "Diablo wind" may have been coined from the observation that the wind blows into the inner Bay Area from the direction of the Diablo Valley and the Diablo Range in adjacent Contra Costa County, and evoking the fiery, sensationalist connotation inherent in "devil wind".

Formation
The Diablo wind is created by the combination of strong inland high pressure at the surface, strongly sinking air aloft, and lower pressure off the California coast. The air descending from aloft as well as from the Coast Ranges compresses as it sinks to sea level where it warms as much as 20 °F (11 °C), and loses relative humidity.

Because of the elevation of the coastal ranges in north-central California, the thermodynamic structure that occurs with the Diablo wind pattern favors the development of strong ridge-top and lee-side downslope winds associated with a phenomenon called the "hydraulic jump". While hydraulic jumps can occur with Santa Ana winds, the same thermodynamic structure that occurs with them typically favors "gap" flow  more frequently. Santa Ana winds are katabatic, gravity-driven winds, draining air off the high deserts, while the Diablo-type wind originates mainly from strongly sinking air from aloft, pushed toward the coast by higher inland pressure.  Thus, Santa Anas are strongest in canyons, whereas a Diablo wind is first noted and blows strongest atop and on the western slopes of the various mountain peaks and ridges around the Bay Area.

In both cases, as the air sinks, it heats up by compression and its relative humidity drops.  This warming is in addition to, and usually greater than, any contact heating that occurs as the air stream crosses the Central Valley and the Diablo Valley. This is the reverse of the normal summertime weather pattern in which an area of low pressure (called the California Thermal Low) rather than high pressure lies east of the Bay Area, drawing in cooler, more humid air from the ocean.

Impacts
This effect is especially dangerous with respect to wildfires as it can enhance the updraft generated by the heat in such fires. While the Diablo wind pattern occurs in both the spring and fall, it is most dangerous in the fall, when vegetation is at its driest. California's predominantly Mediterranean climate has an extended dry period from May through October.

Effects tend to be halved at farther southern coasts, and even can spawn Sundowner winds in Santa Barbara.  Although Santa Ana winds may recur, Diablo events in autumn tend to precede Santa Ana wind events by a few weeks with a lull in between as solar incidence declines.  Southern Californian coasts from Ventura County south are generally unaffected by Diablo events.

See also
Santa Ana wind
Foehn wind
Norte (wind)
Sundowner wind
Hydraulic jump
Dine's compensation
Thermal low
Relative humidity

References

Winds
Climate of California
Weather events in the United States